The Mystic River is a Nigerian dramatic series produced by Rogers Ofime, streaming on Netflix. The series started 14 May 2021. It consists of one season of six episodes for now, streaming on Netflix, but the series is said to consist of 26 episodes in all, starring popular Nigerian Actors Jide Kosoko, Dele Odule, Lota Chukwu, Joke Muyiwa and a few others.

Synopsis 
The Mystic River series was shot in Ijebu Ode area of Nigeria and the series follows a story of different women disappearing from a particular remote village in Nigeria and worthy of notice is the fact that the women disappearing all had one thing in common which was that there were all pregnant, this continued for many years until a particular doctor comes by a child and the doctor was now on her way to uncovering the very dangerous secrets that houses this mystery. 

The press screening of the screening was held at Terra Kulture Cultural Center in Victoria Island area of Lagos state, and it was an eventful event which saw a lot of people coming together to share ideas on the series, the producer also revealed how the story is a combination of good and bad altogether.

Cast 

 Jide Kosoko as Ede King
 Dele Odule as Balogun
 Lota Chukwu as Ebere
 Joke Muyiwa as Adenike
 Jude Chukwuka as Adeniyi
 Olawale Gold as Ademola
 Grace Coker as Widow

Episodes 
6 Episodes

Reception 
The series which is widely described as Nigerian horror series has received different receptions from people around the world and the series has been described as a series which has helped to expose a deadly tradition which needs to be abolished in Nigeria.

The reception received from the movie was amazing as the Producer of the series revealed that the series was borne out of the desire and urge to stand up for things we don't like in the country at large as depicted in the movie, another actor who featured in the movie, Soibifaa Dokuba had also revealed on how he had to do things he's not done in other movies before in this movie, Actor Chukwuka also commended the screenwriter and filmmaker for upholding the African and  the Nigerian culture in the project which is quite commendable.

Awards and nominations

References 

English-language Netflix original programming
Nigerian drama television series
Sequel television series
2010s Nigerian television series